Menv may refer to:
 Menv, animation software related to Marionette and used for example in the production of Tin Toy
 MEnv, abbreviation of 'Master of Environmental Science', an environmental degree
 MENV, the early call sign for the ocean liner SS Elisabethville
 Ministry of the Environment